Al-Watan Al-Akbar (translated The Greatest Homeland) is a pan-Arab musical created in Egypt. The song was composed by the Egyptian Mohammed Abdel Wahab in 1960, and arranged by Egyptian composer Ali Ismael, with lyrics by poet Ahmad Shafik Kamal.

History
It was composed to celebrate the union of Egypt and Syria into the United Arab Republic. It also extolls the Pan-Arabist vision for a united Arab state.

Lyrics

See also 
 Political Song & Music

References

External links
 اغنية الوطن الأكبر
 Abdel Halim Hafez - The Greatest Countryعبد الحليم حافظ - الوطن الأكبرAl Watan Al Akbar
"Al Watan Al Akbar" - Pan-Arabic Patriotic Anthem (YouTube)

1960 songs
Egyptian songs 
Arabic-language songs